Annabel Claire Giles (born 20 May 1959) is a British former television and radio presenter. She currently works as a counsellor and psychotherapist, and has also worked as a model, actress and novelist.

Early life and career
Giles was born in Griffithstown, near Pontypool, Torfaen, in Wales, the eldest of three sisters. She was expelled from boarding school aged 16 for going to see Steve Harley and Cockney Rebel play in Bristol, where she was seen smoking in the street.

Career
Between 1977 and 1982, she trained and worked as a secretary, mostly employed in advertising agencies. Whilst attending a shoot for Boots No. 7 cosmetics, royal make-up artist Barbara Daly suggested taking a shot of her. Giles agreed, and the agency subsequently used the shot for their campaign. Giles was then signed up by top agency Models 1, and became the official model for Max Factor.

She started her media career in the 1990s on Razzmatazz and Night Network, and appeared in the 1993 film Riders. She came to prominence as co-presenter of ITV's Posh Frocks and New Trousers with Sarah Greene. She was in numerous entertainment shows, and a panelist on game shows ranging from Have I Got News for You to Shooting Stars; she was a regular panelist on Through the Keyhole and BBC Radio 4's Loose Ends and has also appeared on BBC Radio 4's Just a Minute. On Noel Edmonds' House Party she guessed a Gotcha! before it had even started.

In 1995, Giles wrote and performed a one-woman show at the Edinburgh Festival, called Looking for Mr.Giles, and a second show the following year, 'Anyone Can be A TV Presenter'.

Giles' first novel, Birthday Girls, reached number 6 in the top 10 in the best-seller lists in 2001. She published Crossing the Paradise Line in 2003 and The Defrosting of Charlotte Small in 2006.

In November 2013, Giles and Vincent Simone entered the Australian jungle as late arrivals in the 13th season of I'm a Celebrity...Get Me Out of Here!. Giles was the first celebrity to leave the jungle, on 1 December.

Since early 2014, Giles has regularly guested on the Channel 5 chat show The Wright Stuff hosted by Matthew Wright. In summer 2018 she appeared on ITV2's "my Shirley Valentine Summer' and is currently the resident agony aunt on the Eleri Sion show for BBC Radio Wales.

Since retraining, she now works as a counsellor/psychotherapist in Brighton and London. Giles is a patron of the charity for parents of children with special needs, Amaze Brighton.

Personal life
Giles married the lead singer of Ultravox, Midge Ure, a founder of Band Aid and Live Aid. Their daughter, Molly McQueen, was born in March 1987. Molly became the lead singer of pop punk group The Faders. Giles and Ure separated in 1989. Giles has a second child, a son named Ted Giles, who was born with XYY syndrome and Asperger syndrome; in 2011, having written a blog outlining the difficulties in educating a child with these issues, she received help from an anonymous benefactor towards his education.

References

External links
Annabel Giles official website

1959 births
Living people
20th-century Welsh people
20th-century Welsh women
21st-century Welsh novelists
21st-century Welsh women writers
21st-century Welsh writers
People from Pontypool
Welsh female models
Welsh women novelists
Welsh television presenters
Welsh women television presenters
I'm a Celebrity...Get Me Out of Here! (British TV series) participants
British psychotherapists
Secretaries
BBC people